Henricia is a large genus of slender-armed sea stars belonging to the family Echinasteridae. It contains about fifty species.

The sea stars from this genus are ciliary suspension-feeders, filtering phytoplankton.

Species
According to the World Register of Marine Species (WoRMS), the following species belong to this genus

Gallery

References

Further reading
 Catalogue of Life. (2008). Catalogue of Life. (2008). Retrieved May 8, 2010, from Species 2000: http://www.catalogueoflife.org/annual-checklist/2008/browse_taxa.php?selected_taxon=991569
 Clark, A.M. & Downey, M.E. (1992) Starfishes of the Atlantic. Chapman & Hall Identification Guide 3, 794 pp.
 Clark, A.M. (1996). An index of names of recent Asteroidea, part 3. Velatida and Spinulosida, in: Jangoux, M.; Lawrence, J.M. (Ed.) (1996).  Echinoderm Studies, 5: pp. 183–250
 Djakonov, A.M. (1961) Survey of the star fish species of the genus Henricia Gray from the north-western parts of the Pacific Ocean.  Investigations of the Far Eastern Seas of the U.S.S.R. Academy of Sciences of U.S.S.R., Moscow-Leningrad, 1961, 7, 5–89
 Kozloff, E.N. (1996) Marine Invertebrates of the Pacific Northwest, with Additions and Corrections. Univ. Washington Press, Seattle, Washington, 539 pp.
 Hansson, H.G. (2001). Echinodermata, in: Costello, M.J. et al. (Ed.) (2001). European register of marine species: a check-list of the marine species in Europe and a bibliography of guides to their identification. Collection Patrimoines Naturels, 50: pp. 336–351
 Rowe, F.W.E & Gates, J. (1995). Zoological Catalogue of Australia 33. Echinodermata. Melbourne: CSIRO Australia, 510 pp.

External links
 Photos of Henricia
 Henricia pumila sp. nov.: A brooding seastar (Asteroidea) from the coastal northeastern Pacific, Zootaxa 2329: 22–36    (2010) (pdf)

Echinasteridae
Asteroidea genera